Gray is an unincorporated community in Knox County, in southeastern Kentucky, United States. The community is located along U.S. Route 25E  East of Corbin. Gray has a post office with ZIP code 40734, which opened on January 25, 1888.

References

Unincorporated communities in Knox County, Kentucky
Unincorporated communities in Kentucky